The 162nd Combat Communications Group is an inactive unit of the California Air National Guard.  It was headquartered at North Highlands Air National Guard Station near Sacramento, California.

Mission
The Air National Guard's mission, state and federal, is to provide trained, well-equipped men and women who can augment the active force during national emergencies or war, and provide assistance during natural disasters and civil disturbances. When air guard units are in a non-mobilized status they are commanded by the governor of their respective state, the Commonwealth of Puerto Rico, Territory of Guam, Territory of the Virgin Islands, and the commanding general of the District of Columbia National Guard. The governors (except in the District of Columbia) are represented in the chain of command by the adjutant general of the state or territory.

The Air National Guard under order of state authorities, provides protection of life and property, and preserves peace, order and public safety. State missions, which are funded by the individual states, include disaster relief in times of earthquakes, hurricanes, floods and forest fires; search and rescue; protection of vital public services; and support to civil defense. The 162nd also provides the Adjutant General with voice and data communications throughout the state of California during state emergencies or contingencies.

Under its federal mission, the 162nd trained, deployed, operated and maintained tactical communications-electronic facilities, and provided tactical command and control communications services for operational commands supporting Military of the United States wartime contingencies. – Under its federal mission, the group trained, deployed, operated and maintained tactical communications-electronic facilities, and provided tactical command and control communications services for operational commands supporting US military wartime contingencies.

History
The 162nd's history goes back to the 599th Signal Aircraft Warning Battalion activated at Drew Field, Florida on 30 March 1944. Shortly thereafter, the unit moved to Oahu, Hawaii. Some of its components saw action in the Marshall and Mariana Islands during World War II. The unit was inactivated on 29 July 1946, but was reactivated on 13 May 1948 as the 162nd Aircraft Control and Warning Group of the California Air National Guard.

On 1 May 1951 the unit mobilized to serve state side during the Korean War until its inactivation on 6 February 1952. The following year, it returned to the State of California and was redesignated the 162nd Tactical Control Group, stationed at Van Nuys Air National Guard Base. At that time three of the presently assigned units (the 147th, 148th, and 149th) were Aircraft Control and Warning Squadrons under the 162nd Group.

On 1 March 1961, the group headquarters moved to the North Highlands Air National Guard Station near Sacramento, and was redesignated the 162nd Communications Group (Mobile). By that time the 222nd, 234th, and 261st units had joined the group. In 1966 the group was redesignated again, to the 162nd Mobile Communications Group. This designation they kept until 10 February 1976, when they were given their present designation of 162nd Combat Communications Group. The 162nd fell under the command of Air Force Air Combat Command at Langley Air Force Base, Virginia.

The group was inactivated on 1 September 2015 and its assets were transferred to the 195th Wing, stationed at Beale Air Force Base, California.

Lineage
 Constituted as the 599th Signal Aircraft Warning Battalion
 Activated on 30 March 1944
 Inactivated on 29 July 1946
 Redesignated 162nd Aircraft Control and Warning Group and allotted to the National Guard in August 1946
 Activated on 13 May 1948 and federally recognized
 Called to active duty on 1 May 1951
 Inactivated on 6 February 1952
 Redesignated 162nd Tactical Control Group and returned to the control of the Air National Guard
 Activated on 1 Feb 1953
 Redesignated 162nd Communications Group (Mobile) on 1 March 1961
 Redesignated 162nd Mobile Communications Group on 16 March 1968
 Redesignated 162nd Combat Communications Group on 1 April 1976
 Redesignated 162nd Combat Information Systems Group on 1 July 1985
 Redesignated 162nd Combat Communications Group on 1 October 1986
 Inactivated on 1 September 2015

Assignments
 Signal Aircraft Warning Training Center, 30 March 1944
 VII Fighter Command c. September 1944
 Signal Aircraft Warning Service, VII Fighter Command, c. September 1944 – 29 July 1946
 62nd Fighter Wing, 13 May 1948
 California Air National Guard, c. 30 October 1950
 Fourth Air Force, 1 May 1951
 Western Air Defense Force, c. 10 May 1951
 25th Air Division, 1 June 1951 – 6 February 1952
 California Air National Guard, 1 January 1953 – 1 September 2015

Components
147th Combat Communications Squadron in San Diego, California
148th Space Operations Squadron at Vandenberg Air Force Base, California
149th Combat Communications Squadron at North Highlands ANGS, California
216th Operations Support Squadron at Vandenberg Air Force Base, California
222nd Combat Communications Squadron in Costa Mesa, California
234th Intelligence Squadron at Beale AFB, California
261st Combat Communications Squadron in Van Nuys, California

Stations
 Drew Field, Florida, 30 March 1944
 Oahu, Hawaii, c. September 1944
 Saipan, Mariana Islands, 22 September 1944 – 29 July 1946
 Van Nuys Municipal Airport, 13 May 1948
 Larson Air Force Base, Washington, c. 10 May 1951 – 6 February 1952
 Van Nuys Air National Guard Base, 1 January 1953
 North Highlands Air National Guard Station, 1 March 1961 – 1 September 2015

References

External links

Groups of the United States Air National Guard
Communications groups of the United States Air Force